Dorcadion pedestre is a species of a longhorn beetle in the subfamily Lamiinae.

Description
They are black colored. The first segments of the antennae and legs are red. The elytron has a white seam and is dull colored, and has a slightly marginal strip at the top of the shoulder.

Subspecies
Dorcadion pedestre kaszabi (Breuning, 1956) — distributed in Hungary.
Dorcadion pedestre pedestre (Poda, 1761) — is widely distributed in Europe.

References

pedestre
Beetles described in 1761
Taxa named by Nikolaus Poda von Neuhaus